The 1970 Davis Cup was the 59th edition of the Davis Cup, the most important tournament between national teams in men's tennis. 31 teams entered the Europe Zone, 11 teams entered the Americas Zone, and 11 teams entered the Eastern Zone. Hong Kong made its first appearance in the tournament.

Brazil defeated Canada in the Americas Inter-Zonal final, India defeated Australia in the Eastern Inter-Zonal final, and Spain and West Germany were the winners of the two Europe Zones, defeating Yugoslavia and the Soviet Union respectively.

In the Inter-Zonal Zone, West Germany defeated India and Spain defeated Brazil in the semifinals, and then West Germany defeated Spain in the final. West Germany were then defeated by the defending champions United States in the Challenge Round. The final was played at the Harold Clark Courts in Cleveland, Ohio, United States on 29–31 August.

Americas Zone

North & Central America Zone

South America Zone

Americas Inter-Zonal Final
Brazil vs. Canada

Eastern Zone

Zone A

Zone B

Eastern Inter-Zonal Final
India vs. Australia

Europe Zone

Zone A

Zone A Final
Spain vs. Yugoslavia

Zone B

Zone B Final
West Germany vs. Soviet Union

Inter-Zonal Zone

Draw

Semifinals
India vs. West Germany

Brazil vs. Spain

Final
West Germany vs. Spain

Challenge Round
United States vs. West Germany

Notes

References

External links
Davis Cup Official Website

 
Davis Cups by year
Davis Cup
Davis Cup
Davis Cup
Davis Cup
Davis Cup
Davis Cup
Davis Cup
1970 in German tennis